The Southwest Section PGA (Southwest PGA) is a professional golf organization founded in 1958 that is headquartered in Scottsdale, Arizona. The Southwest PGA administers golf tournaments for stakeholders and conducts PGA Tour qualifying events. Based on the number of members and associate members, the Southwest PGA is the 5th largest of the 41 Professional Golfers' Association of America Sections. The largest annual event the Southwest PGA Section conducts is the Arizona Open.

, the section is represented by Doug Doxsie on the PGA board of directors.

Chapters 
The Southwest PGA has two chapters of the Section – the Southern Chapter of the Southwest PGA and the Southern Nevada Chapter of the Southwest PGA.

The Southern Chapter of the Southwest PGA was chartered by the Section to provide greater member service to those association members and associates whose facilities are located in the southernmost regions of the Section including Tucson, Arizona.

The Southern Nevada Chapter of the Southwest PGA was chartered by the Section to provide greater member service to those association members and associates whose facilities are located in Clark County including Las Vegas, Nevada.

Tournaments 
The Southwest PGA conducts a number of golfing championship events:
 The Southwest PGA Match Play Championship
 The Arizona Open
 The Southwest PGA Championship/PPC
 The Southwest PGA Jr. League Section Championship

PGA Tour qualifying 
 the Southwest PGA conducts pre-qualifying and Monday qualifying outings for three PGA Tour events:
 Waste Management Phoenix Open
 Shriners Hospitals for Children Open
 Cologuard Classic

See also 
 Ping, an Arizona-based golf manufacturer

References

External links 
 

Golf associations
Golf in Arizona
Golf in Las Vegas
Sports in Scottsdale, Arizona
Sports in Tucson, Arizona
Companies based in Scottsdale, Arizona
1958 establishments in the United States